Metepeira is a genus of orb-weaver spiders first described by F. O. Pickard-Cambridge in 1903. The name is derived from the Ancient Greek μετά and the obsolete genus name Epeira, denoting a genus similar to Epeira.

Species
 it contains forty-four species found from Argentina to Canada, including Caribbean islands:
Metepeira arizonica Chamberlin & Ivie, 1942 – USA, Mexico
Metepeira atascadero Piel, 2001 – Mexico
Metepeira bengryi (Archer, 1958) – Jamaica
Metepeira brunneiceps Caporiacco, 1954 – French Guiana
Metepeira cajabamba Piel, 2001 – Ecuador, Peru
Metepeira calamuchita Piel, 2001 – Argentina
Metepeira celestun Piel, 2001 – Mexico
Metepeira chilapae Chamberlin & Ivie, 1936 – Mexico
Metepeira comanche Levi, 1977 – USA, Mexico
Metepeira compsa (Chamberlin, 1916) – Puerto Rico to Argentina
Metepeira crassipes Chamberlin & Ivie, 1942 – USA, Mexico
Metepeira datona Chamberlin & Ivie, 1942 – USA, Greater Antilles
Metepeira desenderi Baert, 1987 – Ecuador (Galapagos Is.)
Metepeira foxi Gertsch & Ivie, 1936 – USA, Canada
Metepeira galatheae (Thorell, 1891) – Chile, Argentina
Metepeira glomerabilis (Keyserling, 1892) – Colombia to Paraguay, Brazil
Metepeira gosoga Chamberlin & Ivie, 1935 – USA, Mexico
Metepeira grandiosa Chamberlin & Ivie, 1941 – North America
Metepeira gressa (Keyserling, 1892) – Brazil, Paraguay, Uruguay, Argentina
Metepeira inca Piel, 2001 – Peru
Metepeira incrassata F. O. Pickard-Cambridge, 1903 – Mexico
Metepeira jamaicensis Archer, 1958 – Hispaniola, Jamaica, Grand Cayman Is.
Metepeira karkii (Tullgren, 1901) – Chile, Argentina
Metepeira labyrinthea (Hentz, 1847) – North America
Metepeira lacandon Piel, 2001 – Mexico
Metepeira lima Chamberlin & Ivie, 1942 – Peru
Metepeira maya Piel, 2001 – Mexico to Costa Rica
Metepeira minima Gertsch, 1936 – USA to Honduras
Metepeira nigriventris (Taczanowski, 1878) – Peru, Bolivia
Metepeira olmec Piel, 2001 – Mexico to Panama
Metepeira pacifica Piel, 2001 – Honduras, Nicaragua, Costa Rica
Metepeira palustris Chamberlin & Ivie, 1942 – USA, Canada
Metepeira petatlan Piel, 2001 – Mexico
Metepeira pimungan Piel, 2001 – USA
Metepeira rectangula (Nicolet, 1849) – Chile, Argentina
Metepeira revillagigedo Piel, 2001 – Mexico
Metepeira roraima Piel, 2001 – Colombia, Brazil, Guyana
Metepeira spinipes F. O. Pickard-Cambridge, 1903 – USA, Mexico
Metepeira tarapaca Piel, 2001 – Peru, Chile
Metepeira triangularis (Franganillo, 1930) – Cuba, Hispaniola
Metepeira uncata F. O. Pickard-Cambridge, 1903 – Guatemala to Costa Rica
Metepeira ventura Chamberlin & Ivie, 1942 – USA, Mexico
Metepeira vigilax (Keyserling, 1893) – Hispaniola, Bolivia, Brazil, Argentina
Metepeira ypsilonota Mello-Leitão, 1940 – Brazil

References

External links
Metepeira at BugGuide

Araneidae
Araneomorphae genera
Spiders of North America
Spiders of South America